Belinsky (masculine), Belinskaya (feminine), or Belinskoye (neuter) may refer to:

Belinsky (surname) (fem. Belinskaya)
Vissarion Belinsky (1811–1848), Russian literary critic
Belinsky District, a district of Penza Oblast, Russia
Belinsky Urban Settlement, a municipal formation which the town of district significance of Belinsky in Belinsky District of Penza Oblast, Russia is incorporated as
Belinsky (inhabited locality) (Belinskaya, Belinskoye), several inhabited localities in Russia
Belinsky (film), a 1954 film directed by Grigori Kozintsev
3747 Belinskij, an asteroid discovered by Lyudmila Chernykh in 1975